Louis William Chaudet (March 20, 1884 – May 10, 1965) was an American film director of the silent movie era.

Biography
He was born on March 20, 1884, in Manhattan, Kansas. He died May 10, 1965, in Woodland Hills, California. 
Louis was the second child and only son of 5 siblings born to Alfred C. Chaudet (1854-1939) and Eva Ann Schlashman Chaudet (1862-1930). 
Alfred moved his family from Kansas to Pasadena CA between 1900 and 1910 according to the Census of 1910. 
Along with Louis' first born sister Emma Jane, third and fourth born twin sisters Bertha M. and Lucy Ann and finally sister Edna A.

Selected filmography
 The Edge of the Law (1917)
 Follow the Girl (1917)
 Society's Driftwood (1917)
 The Finger of Justice (1918)
 Cupid Angling (1918)
 The Girl of My Dreams (1918)
 The Blue Bonnet (1919)
The Kingfisher's Roost (1921)
 Fools of Fortune (1922)
 Tentacles of the North (1926)
 Eyes Right! (1926)
 A Captain's Courage (1926)
 Speeding Hoofs (1927)
 Outcast Souls (1928)

References

External links

1884 births
1965 deaths
Silent film directors
Writers from Manhattan, Kansas
Film directors from Kansas